Chick Bill is a Belgian humorous Western comic book series created by Tibet. It was first published in 1953 in the magazine Chez Nous Junior, and its Dutch language counterpart  Ons Volkske, and began serial publication on October 19, 1955, in Tintin magazine under the title Les aventures de Chick Bill le cow-boy. 70 books of the series were published, and it lasted until Tibet's death in 2010. Tibet wrote many of the scripts as well as drawing all the episodes, but various stories were written by André-Paul Duchâteau and Greg and one episode was scripted by René Goscinny. Frank Brichau was credited as co-illustrator for the last two books.

The series follows the adventures of Chick Bill, a young cowboy who lives in Arizona, helping people in need and righting wrongs. His companions include an Indian child called Little Poodle ("Petit Caniche" in the French version), a gruff sheriff called Dog Bull and the latter's bumbling and dim-witted deputy, Kid Ordinn. Chick Bill and Little Poodle act as the series' heroes while Dog Bull and Kid Ordinn are the comic relief characters. Kid Ordinn is also the series' antihero and the real protagonist of many episodes.

Evolution
In the very first Chick Bill adventures, the characters were portrayed as anthropomorphic animals, rendered in a manner similar to the Disney style and directed at a younger audience, before the series gradually evolved to feature human characters. This change was made when the series began publication in Tintin, at the request of Hergé who was then the magazine's artistic supervisor.

Sources

 Chick Bill publications in Belgian Tintin and French Tintin BDoubliées 
 Chick Bill albums Bedetheque 

Footnotes

External links
  Tamil Comics Ulagam Chick Bill Complete Story Index With Cover Gallery in India

Belgian comic strips
Belgian comics characters
Lombard Editions titles
Comics characters introduced in 1955
Humor comics
1955 comics debuts
2010 comics endings
Western (genre) comics characters
Western (genre) comics
Comics set in Arizona
Male characters in comics
Fictional cowboys and cowgirls